James Henry Neale (27 December 1828 – 27 December 1890) was an Australian politician.

He was born in Liverpool to pastoralist John Neale and Sarah Lee. He was a butcher before entering politics. In 1864 he was elected to the New South Wales Legislative Assembly for East Sydney. He transferred to Hartley in 1869 and back to East Sydney in 1872 before retiring in 1874. In 1883 he was appointed to the New South Wales Legislative Council, where he remained until his death at Wentworth Falls in 1890.

References

 

1828 births
1890 deaths
Members of the New South Wales Legislative Assembly
Members of the New South Wales Legislative Council
19th-century Australian politicians